"Something's Gonna Change Her Mind" is a song co-written and recorded by American country music artist Mark Collie.  It was released in September 1993 as the fourth single from the album Mark Collie.  The song reached #24 on the Billboard Hot Country Singles & Tracks chart.  The song was written by Collie and Don Cook.

Chart performance

References

1993 singles
1993 songs
Mark Collie songs
Songs written by Mark Collie
Songs written by Don Cook
Song recordings produced by Don Cook
MCA Records singles